Temple Beth Zion is a Reform synagogue located at 805 Delaware Avenue in Buffalo, New York.  Founded in 1850, Temple Beth Zion is the largest Jewish congregation in Western New York and one of the oldest and largest Reform congregations in the nation. The circular building features 10 scallop walls, each a symbol of the 10 commandments. The temple contains a Casavant Frères 48-rank, 4000-pipe organ.

It was listed on the National Register of Historic Places in 2018.

The Benjamin and Dr. Edgar R. Cofeld Judaic Museum, open during regular hours, features a rotating collection of Judaica.

Previous buildings

Before building their current home, the congregation worshiped in two previous buildings. The first building was the old Niagara Street Methodist Church (between Pearl Street and Franklin Street). The church was renovated,  rededicated, and used as the home of Temple Beth Zion until 1886. The second building was a Byzantine-styled, copper-domed temple built in 1890, and located at 599 Delaware Avenue (now Buffalo Clinical Research Center). That building was destroyed in a fire in 1961.

Gallery

References

External links
 Temple Beth Zion

Jews and Judaism in Buffalo, New York
Synagogues completed in 1967
Buildings and structures in Buffalo, New York
Reform synagogues in New York (state)
Museums in Buffalo, New York
Jewish museums in New York (state)
National Register of Historic Places in Buffalo, New York
Synagogues on the National Register of Historic Places in New York (state)